The 2008 Pittsburgh Panthers football team represented the University of Pittsburgh in the 2008 NCAA Division I FBS football season. The season was the fourth under head coach Dave Wannstedt. The 2008 season marked the team's eighth at Heinz Field and the program's 119th season.

The Panthers started the 2008 season with new defensive coordinator Phil Bennett. Ranked in the top 25 for the second time under Wannstedt's leadership, Pitt suffered an early and surprising setback in the opening game against Bowling Green. Pitt rebounded to defeat Buffalo and then Iowa by a score of 21–20. The winning continued when the Panthers upset undefeated and tenth ranked South Florida in a game nationally televised by ESPN. A win at Navy preceded a home upset to Rutgers, Pitt's fourth consecutive loss to the Scarlet Knights. However, Pitt rebounded the following week at Notre Dame with a 36-33 four-overtime victory over the Irish, the longest game ever for both Notre Dame and Pittsburgh. After a 41–7 rout of visiting Louisville, the Panthers improved to 7–2, were bowl-bound for the first time under Wannstedt, and were in contention for a Big East Championship and a BCS bowl bid. However, a loss at Cincinnati in the River City Rivalry eliminated the Panthers from championship contention. Pitt rallied to defeat archrival West Virginia 19–15 on the Friday after Thanksgiving in a nationally televised game on ABC for its second consecutive win in the Backyard Brawl. The following week the Panthers won at UConn to improve to 9-3 and clinched a bid to the Sun Bowl, the first bowl bid under Wannstedt. Pitt lost 3–0 to Oregon State, a team that had previously defeated USC. It was the first time Pitt was held scoreless in twelve years.

Previous season
The Panthers finished with a disappointing 5–7 record in the 2007 season. Rarely though does a losing record leave fans filled with satisfaction and optimism, but that was the case in 2007. It was the third season under the direction of Head Coach Dave Wannstedt. It was also the third consecutive season without a postseason bowl game. The Panthers schedule included six home games and six road games. The schedule was generally viewed as unappealing, lacking any marquee matchups at home. The Panthers appeared on national television on a Wednesday night, October 10, with a 48-45 2OT loss to Navy that ended when Pitt failed to convert on a two-point conversion. For Homecoming 2007 Pitt hosted #23 Cincinnati, defeating the Bearcats 24–17. The final game of the season on December 1 saw the Panthers visit #2 West Virginia. In this game, the 100th edition of the Backyard Brawl, the Panthers defeated the Mountaineers, 13–9, to gain their first road victory of the season and, more importantly, eliminate West Virginia from the National Championship race in one of the most memorable games of the entire 2007 college football season.

Preseason

Recruits
Head Coach Dave Wannstedt signed the top recruiting class in the Big East, his 3rd consecutive top-25 recruiting class, to kick off the 2008 football year. Although Wannstedt had been recruiting well since the beginning of his tenure at Pitt some of that 2008 recruiting power has been attributed to the Panthers' season finale win over West Virginia. The highlights of the class are projected to be WR Jon Baldwin, RB Chris Burns, OT Lucas Nix, LB Shayne Hale, and athlete Cameron Saddler.

Spring practices
Throughout spring practices the defense dominated the offense, but in the annual Blue-Gold Game on April 19 at Heinz Field, the offense got the better of the defense, winning 60-25 under a modified scoring system that favored the offense. The rising stars of the spring practices were defensive tackle Mick Williams, wide receiver Cedric McGee, and newly converted tight end Dorin Dickerson, who all earned the Ed Conway Award given to Pitt's most improved players at spring practices. Other important spring performances included Bill Stull, who re-established himself as the team's top quarterback, and John Malecki, a two-time letterman on defense at nose tackle who earned a starting spot on the offensive line at guard. The Blue-Gold Game was simulcast live locally in Pittsburgh on WPCW and nationally on the NFL Network.

Award watchlists
Several players on the Panthers have been nominated to various award preseason watchlists.

Walter Camp Award:
 LeSean McCoy, RB, Sophomore
 Scott McKillop, LB, Senior
Outland Trophy:
 Gus Mustakas, DT, Senior
John Mackey Award:
Nate Byham, Junior

Bronko Nagurski Trophy:
Scott McKillop, LB, Senior
Lombardi Award:
Scott McKillop, LB, Senior
Dick Butkus Award:
Scott McKillop, LB, Senior

Maxwell Award:
 Derek Kinder, WR, Senior
 LeSean McCoy, RB, Sophomore
Chuck Bednarik Award:
 Scott McKillop, LB, Senior

Roster

Rankings

Pitt began the season ranked at #25 in the AP Poll. It was the Panthers first appearance in any major polling service since 2005 and first preseason ranking since 2003.

Schedule

Game summaries

Bowling Green

The Panthers entered the season in the preseason rankings for the first time since 2005, but their stay didn't last long as they were upset at home by the Falcons. The Panthers, who outgained the Falcons 393–254 on the day, jumped out to an early 14–0 lead in the first half as they outgained Bowling Green 137–6 in the first quarter. After falling behind early the Falcons rallied and took advantage of four costly Pitt turnovers. The Falcons keyed on Panther tailback LeSean McCoy, who fumbled once and was held to 71 yards on 23 carries. The Panthers defense was repeatedly befuddled by some of the odd formations that the Falcons used on offense, such utilizing an imbalanced offensive line or lining up a wide receiver at the quarterback position. However, the following year, defensive coordinator Phil Bennett praised head coach Dave Wannstedt for the way he handled the defeat, saying, "I told many people this: I've seen a lot of head coaches where the whole thing would have toppled after a game like that. I thought the way he handled it – his demeanor not just with the players but with the coaches – was phenomenal." (Game report)

Buffalo

The Panthers, facing a MAC foe for the second straight game, withstood an early charge by the Bulls, taking the lead in the 2nd quarter and holding off Buffalo every time they made a move. LeSean McCoy scored all three touchdowns for the Panthers, scoring on runs of three, one, and two yards. (Game report)

Iowa

Pitt went into the Iowa game looking to make a positive statement for themselves against a quality program as well as wipe away some of the stigma attached to themselves due to their earlier loss to Bowling Green. The game was billed as a showdown of two top running backs, Pitt's LeSean McCoy and Iowa's Shonn Greene. Pitt men's basketball coach Jamie Dixon provided a motivational speech for the football team two days before the game against the Hawkeyes in which he described a potential win over Iowa as a "program-building" victory that could help put the Panthers back onto the national radar, propelling them to new heights of success. The Panthers jumped out to an early 14–3 lead when two Pitt quarterbacks, Bill Stull and Gregg Cross, each ran a called draw in for a touchdown in the first half. Greg Cross, an athletic, change-of-pace, junior college transfer quarterback, made his Panthers debut, scoring a touchdown on a 17-yard scramble in his first play as a Panther. The Panthers offense struggled greatly after taking the lead in the second quarter. However, Pitt's defensive line dominated Iowa's offensive line in the fourth quarter as the well-conditioned yet undersized Panthers outlasted the Hawkeyes. The Panthers' depth on the defensive line also played a role as they were able to rotate nine defensive linemen throughout the game. Coach Wannstedt and his staff were noticeably more aggressive in their play-calling; all three Panthers touchdowns resulted from an offensive drive that included a fourth-down conversion. Although the victory was a big one for the team, the offense still showed great inconsistency and need for improvement. Punter Dave Brytus and linkbacker Scott McKillop were named the Big East Player of the Week for special teams and defense, respectively, following their performances against Iowa. Brytus punted eight times for an average of 47.8 yards, including a longest of sixty yards, one touchback, and one downed inside the twenty. McKillop, who broke his nose on a tackle of Shonn Greene when his nose was crushed by his own facemask, finished with ten tackles, including six solo tackles, two and a half tackles for a loss of nine yards, and one sack. (Game report)

Syracuse

(Game report)

USF

(Game report)

Navy

(Game report)

Rutgers

(Game report)

Notre Dame

The Panthers came away with a 36–33, four-overtime victory after falling behind Notre Dame by two touchdowns, 17–3, at halftime. Conor Lee made the game-winning field goal, one of four overtime fields goals, during his perfect, 5-for-5 day to help lead the Panthers. His five field goals and 18 points are both Pitt records for a kicker; he also extended his school record of consecutive extra points without a miss to 100. LeSean McCoy lead the way on offense with 32 rushing attempts for 169 yards, his 5th straight 100-yard game, and one touchdown as he surpassed 1,000 yards rushing for the season; he also had two catches for 23 yards. The Panthers fell behind in the first half when Notre Dame controlled the clock and took advantage of poor play by Pitt on offense. Quarterbacks Kevan Smith and Pat Bostick, who were playing in place of the injured started Bill Stull, who suffered a concussion in the previous game, were ineffective in the first half, and the running game couldn't get going as McCoy had only 5 yards on 3 carries. In total, the offense only had 71 yards and five first downs in the entire first half. The offense got back on track in the 2nd half as the Panthers scored 10 straight points to tie the game at 17. The Panthers first possession of the 3rd quarter went eight plays and 71 yards, including a converted fourth-and-one pass that Oderick Turner turned into a 37-yard gain. The Panthers next touchdown came on a 15-play, 70-yard drive that used 8:28 of time during the end of the 3rd and beginning of the 4th quarters. Pat Bostick, although he was intercepted three times in the game, persevered and stepped up his play in the second half, leading the Panthers on three critical scoring drives. After the game Bostick, speaking of his own performance, said, ""I came out and made some mistakes out there, forced a couple of things, made a couple of plays. We made enough plays to win though and this was a total team win... But the bottom line is we are here to win a football game and when you throw picks, it is not about you, you can't say 'Woe is me.' It is all about, 'What do I have to do on the next drive to take this team down the field to win the game?'" The Panthers defense, led again by linebacker Scott McKillop with 15 tackles, played significantly better than in the week before, allowing only one big play versus the Irish's offense, a 47-yard pass from Jimmy Clausen to Golden Tate. They also held Notre Dame to only 146 yards in the second half and all four overtimes, including just seven yards on three three-and-out possessions in the third quarter. (Game report)

Louisville

(Game report)

Cincinnati

(Game report)

West Virginia

(Game report)

Connecticut

(Game report)

Oregon State (2008 Sun Bowl)

(Game report)

Coaching staff

Team players drafted into the NFL

Statistics

Regular season totals

Team

Scores by quarter

Individual

Rushing
Minimum five attempts or one touchdown

Passing

Receiving

Award winners
Aaron Berry – Second team All-Big East
Nate Byham – First team All-Big East
C. J. Davis – First team All-Big East
Connor Lee – First team All-Big East, Big East football Scholar-Athlete of the Year
LeSean McCoy – First team All-Big East
Scott McKillop – First team All-American, Big East Defensive Player of the Year, first team All-Big East
Greg Romeus – Second team All-Big East

References

Pittsburgh
Pittsburgh Panthers football seasons
Pittsburgh Panthers football